Anguera is a municipality in the Brazilian State of Bahia.

References

External links

 Wikimapia

Municipalities in Bahia